The Henryk Batuta hoax was a hoax perpetrated on the Polish Wikipedia from November 2004 to February 2006, the main element of which was a biographical article about a nonexistent socialist revolutionary, Henryk Batuta.

History
The perpetrators of the hoax created an article about Henryk Batuta (born Izaak Apfelbaum), a fictional socialist revolutionary and Polish Communist. The fake biography said Batuta was born in Odessa, Ukraine, in 1898 and participated in the Russian Civil War. The article was created on November 8, 2004 and was exposed as a hoax 15 months later, when it was deleted on February 5, 2006.

The article was ten sentences long while it existed on Polish Wikipedia. It gained some prominence after stories about it appeared in prominent Polish newspapers (e.g. Gazeta Wyborcza) and magazines (e.g. Przekrój), as well as a British newspaper (The Observer).

The article also falsely claimed a street in Warsaw was named "Henryk Batuta Street", after the fictional communist official. The anonymous hoaxers who created the article, according to the press calling themselves "The Batuta Army", allegedly wanted to draw attention to the fact that there are still places in Poland named after former communist officials who "do not deserve the honour".

The hoax was exposed when the article was listed for deletion. Even after the article was exposed as a well-organized hoax, its perpetrators tried to convince others of its authenticity by providing false bibliographical information and even by uploading a doctored photograph of a street name "ulica Henryka Batuty" (Henryk Batuta Street). The mystification was "officially" exposed and confirmed on 9 February 2006, when the Polish daily Gazeta Wyborcza and weekly Przekrój published their articles about the hoax.

There is an "ulica Batuty" (Batuta Street) in Warsaw; however, the name comes from the Polish word "batuta", which means "conductor's baton". In this area of the Służew district, there are many street names relating to music and this is one of them. Streets named after a person in Warsaw always carry the name, not only the family name, on the plate. On the street plate for Batuta, there is no name.

Content of the hoax article 
An English translation of the hoax article as it appeared on the Polish Wikipedia on 1 February 2006, when it was finally exposed as a hoax.

References

Polish
 
 
 
 :pl:Wikipedia:SDU/Henryk Batuta

2004 hoaxes
2004 in Poland
History of Wikipedia
Internet hoaxes
Nonexistent people used in hoaxes
Wikipedia controversies
Fictional Polish people
Fictional Polish military personnel